The Natalie Zahle Memorial is located in Ørsted Park in Copenhagen, Denmark, close to the school that she founded in 1862. The school became a model for all upper secondary girl's schools in the country. The Natalie Zahle Memorial was the first monument in Copenhagen erected in honour of a woman who was not of royal ancestry and had exclusively gained prominence on the basis of her own merit.

Description
The centerpiece of the bronze sculpture is a bust of Nathalie Zahle on a tall, integrated pedestal. In front of the bust is a figure of a seated female school teacher holding the hand of a young, female student. The teacher holds an open book in her other hand and the girl has a distant, thoughtful look as if she is being examined in her homework. The scene represents the close relationship between teacher and student that Zahle endorsed.

History

The memorial was created at the initiative of the Committee for the Creation of a Monument to Natalie Zahle. Financing for the memorial was mainly by donations from friends and former students. Ludvig Brandstrup was charged with designing the monument and the location was selected due to its proximity to Zahle's school. The bronze sculptures were cast in Lauritz Tasmussen's Bronze Foundry in Nørrebro. The memorial was unveiled in 1916.

References

External links

Monuments and memorials in Copenhagen
Outdoor sculptures in Copenhagen
Statues of women in Copenhagen
Bronze sculptures in Copenhagen
Sculptures by Ludvig Brandstrup
1916 sculptures
Sculptures of women
1916 establishments in Denmark